Candy Darling (November 24, 1944 – March 21, 1974) was an American actress, best known as a Warhol superstar and transgender icon. She starred in Andy Warhol's films Flesh (1968) and Women in Revolt (1971), and was a muse of The Velvet Underground.

Early life 

Candy Darling was born in Forest Hills, Queens, the child of Theresa Slattery, a bookkeeper at Manhattan's Jockey Club, and James ("Jim") Slattery, who was described as a violent alcoholic.

Darling's early years were spent in Massapequa Park, Long Island, where she and her mother moved after her parents' divorce. She spent much of her childhood watching television and old Hollywood movies, from which she learned to impersonate her favorite actresses such as Joan Bennett and Kim Novak. Darling took a strong interest in the Million Dollar Movie broadcast on television, which she would often watch several times a day. Inspired in part by Novak, Darling began to model her life around "Hollywood glamour-queen prettiness." She had one half-brother, Warren Law II, from her mother's first marriage, to Warren Law. Warren Law II left to serve in the United States military and left Darling as the only child. Law would later deny his connection to Darling.

In a biography about Darling, Cynthia Carr reveals that Darling was "relentlessly bullied" in high school and dropped out at the age of 16 after a group of boys tried to lynch her.

In 1961, she signed up for a course at the DeVern School of Cosmetology in Baldwin, Long Island. Darling later said that she "learned about the mysteries of sex from a salesman in a local children's shoe store" and finally revealed an inclination towards cross-dressing when her mother confronted her about local rumors, which described Darling as "dressing as a girl" and frequenting a local gay bar called The Hayloft. In response, Darling left the room and returned in feminine clothing. Darling's mother would later say that, "I knew then... that I couldn't stop [her]. Candy was just too beautiful and talented."

After coming out publicly, Darling would take a short cab ride to the Long Island Rail Road station, avoiding the attention of neighbors she would receive by walking to the train. From there, she would take the train to Manhattan, often sitting across from Long Island starlet Joey Heatherton. In Manhattan, she would refer to her family home at 79 First Avenue in Massapequa Park as her "country house", and spent time in Greenwich Village, meeting people through Seymour Levy on Bleecker Street.

Darling met Jeremiah Newton in the summer of 1966, when Newton was on his first trip to Greenwich Village from his home in Flushing, Queens. The two became friends and roommates, living together in Manhattan and Brooklyn until the time of Darling's death in 1974.

Darling first took the name Hope Slattery. According to Bob Colacello, Darling took this name in 1963/1964 after she started going to gay bars in Manhattan and visiting a doctor on Fifth Avenue for hormone injections. Jackie Curtis said that Darling adopted the name from a well-known Off Broadway actress named Hope Stansbury, with whom she lived for a few months in an apartment behind the Caffe Cino. Holly Woodlawn remembers that Darling's name evolved from Hope Dahl to Candy Dahl, then to Candy Cane. Jeremiah Newton said she took the name "Candy" out of a love for sweets. In her autobiography, Woodlawn recalled that Darling had adopted the name because a friend of hers called her "darling" so often that it stuck.

Warhol years 
Before they met, in 1967, Darling saw Andy Warhol at The Tenth of Always, an after-hours club. Darling was with Jackie Curtis, who invited Warhol to a play that she had written and directed, called Glamour, Glory and Gold, starring Darling as "Nona Noonan" and a young Robert De Niro, who played six parts in the play.

Warhol cast Darling in a short comedic scene in Flesh (1968) with Jackie Curtis and Joe Dallesandro. After Flesh, Darling was cast in a central role in Women in Revolt (1971).

Women in Revolt was first shown at the first Los Angeles Filmex as Sex. It was later shown as Andy Warhol's Women.

The day after the celebrity preview, a group of women carrying protest signs demonstrated outside the cinema against the film, which they thought was anti-women's liberation. When Darling heard about this, she said, "Who do these dykes think they are anyway? Well, I just hope they all read Vincent Canby's review in today's Times. He said I look like a cross between Kim Novak and Pat Nixon. It's true – I do have Pat Nixon's nose."

Darling worked for a short time as a barmaid at Slugger Ann's, the bar owned by Jackie Curtis's grandmother.

After Warhol 

Darling went on to appear in other independent films, including Silent Night, Bloody Night, Wynn Chamberlain's Brand X, and a co-starring role in Some of My Best Friends Are... She appeared in Klute with Jane Fonda and Lady Liberty with Sophia Loren. In 1971, she went to Vienna to make two films with director Werner Schroeter: The Death of Maria Malibran, and another film that was never released. Darling's attempt at breaking into mainstream movies, by campaigning for the leading role in Myra Breckinridge (1970), led to rejection and bitterness.

Her theatre credits include two Jackie Curtis plays, Glamour, Glory and Gold (1967) and Vain Victory: The Vicissitudes of the Damned (1971). Vain Victory was directed by Curtis at La MaMa Experimental Theatre Club in May/June 1971, and featured many other performers from Warhol's Factory, including Curtis, Ondine, Tally Brown, Mario Montez, Samuel Adams Green, Mary Woronov, Francesco Scavullo, Jay Johnson (twin brother of Jed Johnson), Holly Woodlawn, Steina and Woody Vasulka, Eric Emerson, and Warhol himself.

Darling was in the original 1972 production of Tennessee Williams' play Small Craft Warnings, cast at Williams' request. She starred in the 1973 revival of The White Whore and the Bit Player, a 1964 play by Tom Eyen, at La MaMa Experimental Theatre Club. The production was bilingual, called The White Whore and the Bit Player/La Estrelle y La Monja, and directed by Manuel Martin Jr. Darling's character, a Hollywood actress known only as "the Whore", was based on Marilyn Monroe. She performed in the English version opposite Hortensia Colorado, and the Spanish version was performed by Magaly Alabau and Graciela Mas. As a review of the play stated, "With her teased platinum hair and practiced pouts, Miss Darling looks like her character and resolutely keeps her acting little-girl-lost. The role-playing aspect works to her advantage. She could, after all, be a male lunatic pretending to be the White Whore."

Illness and death 
Darling died of lymphoma on March 21, 1974, aged 29, at the Columbus Hospital division of the Cabrini Health Care Center. In a letter written on her deathbed and intended for Warhol and his followers, Darling wrote, "Unfortunately before my death I had no desire left for life ... I am just so bored by everything. You might say bored to death. Did you know I couldn't last. I always knew it. I wish I could meet you all again."

Her funeral, held at the Frank E. Campbell Funeral Chapel, was attended by huge crowds. Julie Newmar read the eulogy. Darling's birth name was never spoken by the minister or any of the eulogizers. Faith Dane played a piano piece, and Gloria Swanson saluted Darling's coffin.

Darling was cremated, and her ashes were interred by Jeremiah Newton in the Cherry Valley Cemetery in Cherry Valley, New York, a village at the foot of the Catskill Mountains.

Legacy

2010 documentary 
A feature-length documentary on Darling, titled Beautiful Darling, premiered at the Berlin International Film Festival (or Berlinale) in February 2010. The documentary features archival film and video footage, photographs, personal papers, archival audio interviews with Tennessee Williams, Valerie Solanas, Jackie Curtis and Darling's mother, as well as contemporary interviews with Holly Woodlawn, Ruby Lynn Reyner,  Fran Lebowitz, John Waters, Julie Newmar, Peter Beard, and Taylor Mead. Chloë Sevigny narrates the film, voicing Darling's private diary entries and personal letters. The film was directed by James Rasin and produced by Jeremiah Newton and Elisabeth Bentley.

Portrayals

Film 
 Darling was first portrayed on film by Stephen Dorff in I Shot Andy Warhol (1996).
 Darling is portrayed by Willam Belli in the 2011 HBO film Cinema Verite.

Stage 
 Darling was portrayed by Brian Charles Rooney in Pop!, a musical written by Anna K. Jacobs and Maggie-Kate Coleman and directed by Mark Brokaw at Yale Repertory Theatre in November–December 2009.
 Darling was portrayed by actor Vince Gatton in the off-Broadway production of David Johnston's play Candy and Dorothy, for which Gatton received a Drama Desk award nomination.

Music 
 Darling and her friend Taffy are mentioned in the chorus of the 1967 Rolling Stones song "Citadel".
 Darling is the subject of the song "Candy Says", the opening track on The Velvet Underground's self-titled album in 1969, written by Lou Reed and sung by Doug Yule.
 The second verse of Lou Reed's 1972 "Walk on the Wild Side" is devoted to Darling.
 American musician St. Vincent named a song after Darling in her album Daddy's Home, and undertakes a persona inspired by Darling for the album visuals.

Visual arts 
 Greer Lankton made a bust of Darling that was displayed at the 1995 Whitney Biennial.
 Peter Hujar's photo, "Candy Darling on her Deathbed", was used by Antony and the Johnsons for the cover of their 2005 Mercury Music Prize-winning album I Am a Bird Now.

Namesakes 
 In 2009, C☆NDY, which calls itself "the first transversal style magazine", debuted. It is named after Darling.
 Byredo created a candle scent named after Darling.

Biopic 
In January 2019, a biopic about Candy was announced. It will be written by Stephanie Kornick and executive produced by Zackary Drucker. The film is being produced by Christian D. Bruun, Katrina Wolfe, and Louis Spiegler. Hari Nef has been cast in the role of Darling.

Works

Filmography

References 
Citations

Works cited

Further reading

External links 
 
 
 Darling's page on La MaMa Archives Digital Collections

1944 births
1974 deaths
20th-century American actresses
Actresses from New York City
American film actresses
Deaths from cancer in New York (state)
Deaths from lymphoma
American LGBT actors
LGBT people from New York (state)
People from Forest Hills, Queens
Transgender actresses
People from Massapequa Park, New York
People associated with The Factory